Wu Yuxiang (Wu Yu-hsiang, 1812?–1880?) was the founder of Wu (Hao)-style t'ai chi ch'uan. Wu was a scholar from a wealthy and influential family who became a senior student of Yang Luchan, the founder of Yang-style t'ai chi ch'uan. Wu also studied for a brief time with Chen Qingping, a master of Chen-style and Zhaobao-style t'ai chi ch'uan.

There is a relatively large body of writing attributed to Wu on the subject of t'ai chi ch'uan theory, writings that are considered influential by other t'ai chi styles were the source of what are now known as the T'ai chi classics.

Wu developed his own style of t'ai chi and shared it with members of his family, who also wrote about the art. He trained with his two older brothers Wu Chengqing (武澄清, 1800-1884)) and Wu Ruqing (武汝清, 1803-1887), and took on two nephews as disciples. One of those nephews Li Yiyu (Li I-yu, 李亦畬, 1832–1892), authored several particularly important works on t'ai chi ch'uan. The other nephew, Li Yiyu's younger brother Li Qixuan (Li Ch'i-hsuan, 李啟軒, 1835-1899), worked closely with Yiyu to further develop the art, and was also credited as an author of at least one work on the subject of t'ai chi.

The style of t'ai chi ch'uan that Wu taught was eventually known, because of its later transmission by three generations of students of his nephew named Hao, as Wu (Hao)-style t'ai chi ch'uan. Hao Weizhen (郝為真, Hao Wei-chen, 1849-1920) subsequently taught Sun Lu-t'ang, the founder of Sun-style t'ai chi ch'uan.

T'ai chi ch'uan lineage tree with Wu (Hao)-style focus

References

Chinese tai chi practitioners
Martial arts school founders
1812 births
1880 deaths
Sportspeople from Handan
19th-century philanthropists